St. Mark's Chapel may refer to:

St. Mark's Episcopal Chapel (Annandale, Minnesota), listed on the NRHP in Minnesota
St. Mark's Chapel (Raleigh, North Carolina), a former church that is a contributing property in a historic district in North Carolina
St. Mark's Chapel, Vancouver, British Columbia, Canada
St. Nicholas of Myra Church (Manhattan), built as the Memorial Chapel of St. Mark's Church in-the-Bowery

See also
St. Mark's (disambiguation)
St. Mark's Church (disambiguation)
St. Mark's Episcopal Church (disambiguation)